Eleanor Ruth Duckworth (born 1935) is a teacher, teacher educator, and psychologist.

Duckworth earned her Ph.D. (Docteur en sciences de l'éducation) at the Université de Genève in 1977. She grounds her work in Jean Piaget and Bärbel Inhelder's insights into the nature and development of understanding and intelligence and in their clinical interview method. Duckworth also has been an elementary school teacher. Her participation in the 1960s curriculum development projects Elementary Science Study and African Primary Science Program was germinal for her insights and practices in exploratory methods in teaching and learning. She has conducted teacher education, curriculum development, and program evaluation in the United States, Europe, Latin America, Africa, Asia and her native Canada. Duckworth is also a coordinator of Cambridge United for Justice with Peace and a performing modern dancer.

Short biography
Duckworth is the daughter of Jack and Muriel Duckworth, Canadian peace workers and social and community activists. She is named after Eleanor Roosevelt. Jack Duckworth, born in 1897, was a highly regarded leader in the national YMCA movement and an outspoken pacifist from the 1930s until his death in 1975. Muriel Duckworth, born in 1908 (maiden name Ball), who celebrated her hundredth birthday on October 31, 2008, was renowned as a crusader for social justice, women's rights, de-militarization, educational development and fighting poverty. She was one of the 1000 women worldwide nominated for the Nobel Peace Prize in 2005.

Duckworth studied ballet in Halifax, Nova Scotia, as a student of Irene Apinee and Jury Gotshalks, and danced in the Gotshalks Halifax Ballet.  She stopped her dance studies at the age of 15, and started again at the age of 58.

She is the sister of Montreal filmmaker Martin Duckworth, and Nova Scotia businessman and musician John Duckworth.

(Re-)discovering Piaget 
However, Piaget's work was little known in the North American educational community after World War II until Eleanor Duckworth, a student of Piaget at that time, introduced his methods and analysis into the classroom and the US educational research community.

Eleanor Duckworth first met Jean Piaget in 1957 in Paris at the Sorbonne where she was a graduate student. For the next two years Duckworth studied with Jean Piaget and Bärbel Inhelder at the Institut des Sciences de l'Education in Geneva, Switzerland. She served as a research and teaching assistant for the second of those years. She subsequently entered a doctoral program in cognitive psychology at Harvard University, and dropped out. For the years to come, the work with Piaget and Inhelder would have an important impact on her thinking and further development.  She returned to Geneva to finish her doctorate.

At Inhelder's recommendation, Duckworth began to participate in the Elementary Science Study (ESS) in 1962, a curriculum development and science education reform project that grew out of MIT and became the foundation of the organization now known as Education Development Center. The project was initiated by Jerrold Zacharias and participating scientists and teachers included, among others, David Hawkins, Mike Savage, Philip Morrison, Phylis Morrison, Ben Nichols, Claryce Evans, Lynn Margulis, Marion Walter, David Webster, Ed Prenowitz, Mike Rice, Cap Weston, Elsa Dorfman, and Edith Churchill. The project involved "[putting] physical materials into children's hands from the start and help[ing] each child investigate through these materials the nature of the world around him [stet]" (ESS, 1970, p. 7). Teachers and students experimented with natural materials like bulbs, batteries, pendulums or butterflies, ice cubes and earthworms. During her four years as a staff member at the ESS, Duckworth struggled to incorporate the theory and clinical method of Piaget into the work she and her colleagues did in classrooms (Duckworth, 2006, p. 1).

A breakthrough for communicating Piaget's work to a broader educational community occurred in 1964, when Duckworth acted as the English translator and interpreter of Piaget during a bi-coastal conference at Cornell University and University of California, Berkeley. Duckworth reported to her colleagues at the ESS about the conference by writing a short paper, "Piaget Rediscovered". This paper gave its name to the book that came out of the conference, a collection of papers on developmental psychology and curriculum development. The book was instrumental in re-awakening interest in Piaget's work among educators.

Deciding to devote herself to education, she sought work as elementary school teacher in Montreal. In 1970 she took a job at the Atlantic Institute of Education, in Halifax, Nova Scotia, as director of "The Lighthouse Project", a curriculum development and teacher education program for the four Atlantic provinces of Canada.

Collaborating with Jeanne Bamberger at the Division for Study and Research in Education at MIT, they initiated "The Teacher Project". During this project Duckworth and Bamberger worked to facilitate research experiences among teachers who worked in elementary schools in Cambridge, Massachusetts in 1978. Duckworth continued to work with a smaller group of these same teachers for seven more years. This group, the Moon Group, explored the behaviour of the moon as a practice of learning and teaching.

Duckworth wrote essays based on some of these experiences with Piaget, the Cambridge Teacher Project, the Moon Group, and her own teaching in her landmark book The Having of Wonderful Ideas (1987|2006).

The developmentalist tradition 
Within teacher education in the United States in the twentieth century, Duckworth's contributions relate to a progressive or developmentalist approach. The idea of a teacher acting as a researcher is embraced by the following four traditions of reflective teaching practice: academic, social efficiency, developmentalist and social reconstructivist. The developmentalist tradition considers that the teacher is both a practitioner and a researcher: "The teacher as researcher strand of this tradition has emphasized the need to foster the teacher's experimental attitude toward practice and to help teachers initiate and sustain ongoing inquiries in their own classroom" (Zeichner, 1992, p. 165).

Duckworth (2006, p. xiii) wrote in her book The Having of Wonderful Ideas that she built her developmental approach on two foundations very powerful to her: 
The work of Jean Piaget and Bärbel Inhelder. Duckworth was a student and colleague in the late 1950s and she acted as the English translator and interpreter of Piaget during his American lectures, until his death in 1980. Two aspects in the work of Piaget and Inhelder were especially important for Duckworth (2005b, pp. 258–259): First, the basic idea of assimilation, that is, every person creates meaning on her own, while taking any experience into her own schemes, structures, previous understanding. Second, the clinical interviewing or clinical method, that is, engaging children in talking about their ideas with a researcher.
Her experience with the Elementary Science Study (ESS) curriculum development program. This program is consistent with the work of Piaget and Inhelder in psychology and it is considered to be a milestone in the history of science education. The Elementary Science Study tackled the following main question: "So how do we present material 'from without' so that the activity that 'the mind itself undergoes' is valuable?" (Duckworth, 2005a, p. 142)

As a constructivist who defines teaching as helping people learn, Duckworth emphasizes the importance of engaging learners with phenomena, understanding students' current understandings and trying to facilitate students' own thinking. The central question of Duckworth's (2006: xiv) research over five decades continues to be: "How do people learn and what can anyone do to help?" In the process of investigating this question, she has developed a research method which she has called expanded clinical interviewing, teaching/learning research and critical exploration. These three phrases emerged in the course of her research and are used interchangeably (Duckworth, 2006, p. xv).

Critical Exploration 
Bärbel Inhelder first applied the name critical exploration to Piaget's clinical interviewing which included observing children as well as interviewing and interacting with a child who is experimenting and investigating a problem set by the researcher. Inhelder introduced this method to pedagogical contexts (Inhelder, Sinclair & Bovet, 1974, p. 18–20). Duckworth (2005b, p. 258–259) describes critical exploration as having two facets: curriculum development and pedagogy. In the context of critical exploration, curriculum development means: the teacher is planning how to engage students' minds in exploring the subject matter. Pedagogy constitutes the practice by which teachers invite students to express their thoughts:

During critical exploration, exploring goes on in two modes: In one mode, the child explores the subject matter and in the other mode, the researcher-teacher explores the child's thinking. Hence, for the teacher, critical exploration finds itself at the nexus of research and teaching where teacher and learner support each other (Shorr, 2007, p. 369–370):

Consequently, Duckworth (2008b) suggests that a classroom teacher can take on the role of a researcher. The teacher explores too, by interacting with students' learning. It is the teacher's work to present engaging problems, and attend to students' ways of figuring them out helping them to notice what's interesting. For example, the teacher listens to students explain their ideas and asks them questions that seek to take students' thinking further (Duckworth, 2006, p. 173–174).

The main ideas of the teaching/learning research 
Outlining her approach, Duckworth (2006, p. 173) states: "As a student of Piaget, I was convinced that people must construct their own knowledge and must assimilate new experiences in ways that make sense to them. I knew that, more often than not, simply telling students what we want them to know leaves them cold". Considering learning and teaching, critical exploration stresses the following aspects:
 Students bring their prior expectations, interests and knowledge to the learning experience: The students' experience and insights are of high value as the development of their personal intelligence emerges through actions and the having of wonderful ideas. To reach deep understanding, students need to start from their own sets of ideas, be engaged in the subject matter and make a connection from the actual problem or subject matter to what they already understand. Consequently, the students do the talking as they explain the sense they are making, while the teacher listens. However, this requires a learning culture that accommodates students in feeling free and safe to say what their emerging ideas are, and that what they say is valued (Duckworth in Meek, 1991). "[B]y opening up to children the many fascinating aspects of the ordinary world and by enabling them to feel that their ideas are worthwhile having and following through, their tendency to have wonderful ideas can be affected in significant ways" (Duckworth, 2006, p. 12).
 Students need something complex that challenges them to explore: Students need to engage with the phenomena of study, not schematic substitutes. It is in struggling with complex problems that every learner undergoes the process of constructing their own knowledge. As learners experience internal cognitive conflicts in what they believe about the subject matter, their minds become more deeply engaged with the problem at hand. Learners' efforts in figuring out questions and puzzles are more productive than knowing the right answer because higher order thinking processes are involved. Therefore, teachers of critical exploration value the diverse efforts that students make during their explorations even where these efforts do not arrive at expected answers. In facilitating this investigative work, the questions that are asked over and over again by students and teachers alike are, for example: "What do you notice?" What do you mean?" "How are you thinking about it?" "Why do you think that?" "Is that the same as what (someone else) thought they saw?" "How did you figure that?" "How did you do that?" "How does that fit with what she just said?" "Could you give an example?" The responses that teachers and students give to each other might have the form of: "I don't quite get it." "It doesn't make sense (to me)." "I don't really get that; could you explain it another way?" Hence, most important: It is the students who make sense and understand by trying out their ideas, explaining them to others, and seeing how this holds up in other people's and their own eyes and in the light of the phenomena itself (Duckworth, 2002).
 Teacher as facilitator with a researcher mind-set: The teacher creates situations and selects environmental resources that get students excited and engaged in learning that is meaningful to them. The teacher is sensitive to the thoughts and feelings of learners, puts students at ease, engages learners, invites them to talk about their ideas, waits for learners to think and listens and then, reacts to the substance of their answers without judging them. The teacher takes a neutral researcher's stance. Instead of lecturing, the teacher creates situations that put learners into confronting their thinking processes, where they are responsible for their own learning. The teachers' role then, is asking questions like "When you say x, what do you mean by it?" "How would that work if applied to this situation?" "Am I right in understanding your idea, if I say it this way?" to reveal students' thinking and take their own thoughts further. That way, the teacher refrains from signaling to the students what he might expect them to say. Instead, the teacher provides opportunities for learners to reveal their own understanding. The thoughts that learners have become visible through the responses they make including: actions, drawings, gestures, constructions, dialogues and sound, for example. Guiding questions for the teacher himself might be as follows (Duckworth, 2005b, p. 261): "What lies behind this response? How may the other children be responding to it? What question shall I ask next, or what experience to offer next, or where to direct their attention next?" The students' work is to make sense of the phenomena of study. The teachers' work is to ensure safe and supportive conditions in the classroom so that the students can take intellectual risks and do their work investigatively.

Teacher education 
If teachers are to teach their students exploratively, they must have experienced learning as explorers themselves (Duckworth, 2006). In the teacher education work that Duckworth does at Harvard University and elsewhere, she provides teachers with the opportunity to live through and think about the phenomena of teaching and learning. She involves teacher education students in the effort to understand somebody else's understanding. She considers it important for teachers to know what their students are understanding, that is: what sense the students are making of the subject matter (Duckworth in Meek, 1991, p. 32).

In her courses at Harvard University she applies her teaching approach by using critical exploration to teach critical exploration. Her famous T-440 course titled Teaching and Learning: "The Having of Wonderful Ideas" is usually conducted with two parallel groups, each having up to 50 teacher education students. Duckworth states on her course website: "The course starts from the premise that there are endless numbers of adequate pathways for people to come to understand subject matters. Curriculum and assessment must build on this diversity. A second premise is that every person can get involved with and enjoy and get good at every subject matter."

In her university teaching Duckworth (2006, p. 9 and 173–192) tries to engage teacher education students with three major kinds of teaching and learning phenomena:
 Films and/or (life) demonstrations with one or two children or adolescents. In this way teacher education students can observe children/adults learning while instructors are teaching by engaging those learners and by listening and understanding the explanations of those learners;
 Teacher education students carry out a similar inquiry outside of classtime, where they meet with one or two people who are their practice learners. In this way, each teacher education student creates, on his own, a trial critical exploration for learners and then reflects on it in writing;
 Teacher education students learn as a group about a particular subject other than teaching and learning. Through this exploratory study by the group, the teacher education students are learning in the same way that the children in their classes will be learning. This subject could be from any area of study such as: pendulums, mathematical permutations, history, arts and poems.

In the summer of 2013 Professor Duckworth went to the south of England as the guest of honor of the holistic Brockwood Park School for the education conference taking place there entitled "When is Teaching? Getting in or out of the way at the right time".

Awards (selection) 
 Honorary doctorate, Colby College (2013)
 Inaugural Barbara K. Lipman Award for Advances in Early Childhood Education given annually to a researcher, writer or program designer who has significantly influenced early childhood education or child growth and development, University of Memphis  (2008).
 Doctor of the University, Honoris Causa, University of Ottawa (1993).
 The book "The having of wonderful ideas" and other essays on teaching and learning won the American Educational Association Award for writing on teaching and teacher education (1987).
 Inaugural Catherine Molony Memorial Lecture at City College School of Education, Workshop Center for Open Education (1979).
 Doctor of Humane Letters, Honoris Causa, Lesley University (1977).

Bibliography (selection) 
 
 
 Duckworth, E.R. (1973a). Language and Thought. In M. Schwebel & J. Raph (eds), Piaget in the classroom (pp. 132–154). New York: Basic Books.
 Duckworth, E.R. (1973b). The having of wonderful ideas. In M. Schwebel & J. Raph (Eds.), Piaget in the classroom (pp. 258–277). New York: Basic Books.
 Duckworth, E.R. (1973c). Piaget takes a teacher's look. An interview with Jean Piaget. Learning: The magazine for Creative Teaching, 22–27.
 Duckworth, E.R. (1978). The African primary science program: An evaluation and extended thoughts. Grand Forks: North Dakota Study Group on Evaluation.
 
 
 
 Duckworth, E.R. (1990). Opening the world. In E. Duckworth, J. Easley, D. Hawkins & A. Henriques (Eds.), Science education: A minds-on approach for the elementary years (pp. 21–59). Hillsdale, NJ: Erlbaum.
 
 Duckworth, E.R. (2001a). Inventing density. In E. Duckworth (ed.), "Tell me more": Listening to learners explain (pp. 1–41). New York: Teachers College Press. Original publication 1986.
 Duckworth, E.R. (eds.) (2001b). "Tell me more": Listening to learners explain. New York: Teachers College Press. Booknote retrieved, April 12, 2009, at http://www.hepg.org/her/booknote/79 Book review retrieved, April 12, 2009, at http://www.nicholasmeier.com/Articles/2005-04_duckworth.htm
 Duckworth, E.R. (2002). "The having of wonderful ideas" and other essays on teaching and learning. Fieldwork - Notes from expeditionary learning classrooms, X(2), 11–12. Book review
 Duckworth, E.R. (2005a). A reality to which each belongs. In B.S. Engel (ed.), Holding values: What we mean by progressive education (pp. 142–147). Portsmouth, NH: Heinemann.
 
 Duckworth, E.R. (2006). "The having of wonderful ideas" and other essays on teaching and learning. Third edition. New York: Teachers College Press.
 Duckworth, E.R. (2008). Teaching as research. In A. Miletta & M. Miletta (eds), Classroom conversations. A collection of classics for parents and teachers (pp. 119–144). New York: The New Press.
 Duckworth, E.R. & Fusaro, M. (2008b). Critical exploration in the classroom. Harvard Graduate School of Education - Usable Knowledge.
 
 Duckworth, E.R. and the Experienced Teachers Group (1997). Teacher to teacher: Learning from each other. New York: Teachers College Press. Book review retrieved, April 12, 2009, at https://web.archive.org/web/20081006191210/http://edrev.asu.edu/reviews/rev42.htm
 Duckworth, E.R. (2010). "The Soul Purpose". Learning Landscapes, 3 (2): 21–28.
 Duckworth, E.R. & Julyan, C. (2005). A constructivist perspective on teaching and learning science. In C.T. Fosnot (Ed.), Constructivism: Theory, perspectives, and practice (pp. 61–79). 2nd edition. New York: Teachers College Press.
 Duckworth, E.R., Easley, J., Hawkins, D. & Henriques, A. (Eds.) (1990). Science education: A minds-on approach for the elementary years. Hillsdale, NJ: Erlbaum.

Notes

References 
 Bobilya, A.J. & Daniel, B. (2009). Eleanor Duckworth: The teacher's teacher. In T. Smith & C.E. Knapp (eds), Beyond Dewey and Hahn: Foundations for experiential education, Vol I (pp. 113–122). Lake Geneva, WI: Raccoon Institute.
 Cavicchi, E.M. (1999). Experimenting with wires, batteries, bulbs, and the induction coil: Narratives of teaching and learning physics in the electrical investigations of Laura, David, Jamie, myself and the nineteenth century experiments - our developments and instruments. Thesis. Cambridge, MA: Harvard Graduate School of Education.
 Cavicchi, E.M. (June 2007). Opening possibilities in experimental science and its history: Critical explorations with pendulums and singing tubes. Session 2.1.1.3, Ninth International History, Philosophy and Science Teaching Conference. Published in Interchange, 39, 2008, 415–442.
 
 Cavicchi, E.M., Chiu, S-M. & Hughes-McDonnell, F. (2009). Introductory Paper on Critical Explorations in Teaching Art, Science, and Teacher Education. The New Educator, 5(3), 189–204.
 Chira, S. (1989). Wherein balloons teach the learning process. Special to New York Times, November 29, 1998.
 
 Dorn, M.S. (1979). An example for us all. Learning with Breadth and Depth, by Eleanor Duckworth, ed. R. Dropkin, Workshop Center for Open Education, New York.
 Elementary Science Study (ESS) (1970). Elementary science study reader. Newton, MA: Education Development Center, Inc.
 Falk, B. (2009). From the editor - Critical explorations: The road to understanding. The New Educator 5(3), i-ii.
 Hsueh, Y. (1997). Jean Piaget, spontaneous development and constructivist teaching. Thesis. Cambridge, MA: Harvard School of Education.
 
 Inhelder, B., Sinclair, H. & Bovet, M. (1974). Learning and the development of cognition. Cambridge, MA: Harvard University Press.
 
 Pettigrew, N.G. (Spring 2007). The art of listening. The Exeter Bulletin, 42–45.
 Ripple, R.E. & Rockcastle, V.N. (Eds.) (1964). Piaget rediscovered. A report of the conference on cognitive studies and curriculum development. Cornell University: School of Education.
 
 Zeichner, K.M. (1992). Conceptions of reflective teaching in contemporary U.S. teacher education program reforms. In L. Valli (Ed.), Reflective teacher education - cases and critiques (pp. 161–173). Albany, NY: SUNY Press.

Further reading
 Annenberg Media (w.d.). Tune in to the moon. Materials, activities and resources regarding learning about the moon.
 Duckworth, E.R. (1973). Learning about thinking and vice versa (videorecording, 32 min.), Films Inc., Ford Foundation. Educator Eleanor Duckworth demonstrates children's thinking processes (and developmental differences in children's learning) through classic Piaget-type interviews held during a workshop for teachers, teacher aides, and principals of two inner-city Philadelphia schools.
 Duckworth, E.R. (2009a). Faculty profile, Harvard University School of Education.
 Duckworth, E.R. (2009b). "Critical thinking through learner-centred teaching". An interview with Eleanor Duckworth conducted by Anis Haffar.
 Duckworth, E.R. (2010a). Talk at Lesley University, April 30, 2010. Boston, MA.
 Duckworth, E.R. (2012). "Confusion, play and postponing certainty", Harvard Thinks Big. Harvard Graduate School of Education, February 16, 2012, Cambridge, MA. 
 Duckworth, E.R. (2012a). Commencement 2012: Professor Eleanor Duckworth's Convocation Speech, Harvard University Graduate School of Education, Cambridge, MA.
 Duckworth, E.R. (2012b). . TEDxPioneerValley.
 Evans, R.I. (1973). Jean Piaget. The man and his ideas. New York: E.P. Dutton & Co., Inc.; Translated by Eleanor Duckworth.
 Falk, B. (ed.) (2009). Critical explorations: The road to understanding. Theme issue in The New Educator 5(3).
 Mayer, S.J. (2009). Critical exploration - website
 Piaget, J. (1968, lecture one). Genetic Epistemology. A series of lectures delivered by Piaget at Columbia University. Published by Columbia University Press; translated by Eleanor Duckworth.

1935 births
Living people
Colby College alumni
Educational psychologists
American educational theorists
American humanists
American women psychologists
21st-century American psychologists
Harvard Graduate School of Education faculty
Eleanor
Pragmatists
Scientists from Montreal
American women academics
21st-century American women
20th-century American psychologists